"All for You" is a song by American singer Janet Jackson, released as the lead single from her seventh studio album, All for You, on March 6, 2001. Written and produced by Jackson, Jimmy Jam, and Terry Lewis, "All for You" is a dance-pop song that heavily samples "The Glow of Love" by Change, while lyrically is about flirting with someone on the dance floor. It received positive reviews from critics and was noted for its transition to a brighter and more optimistic sound from the darker tone of the singer's previous album, The Velvet Rope (1997).

Jackson was titled the "Queen of Radio" by MTV as the song made radio history by becoming the first single to be added to every pop, rhythmic, and urban radio format within its first week of release. It also set the record for the highest debut of a song which was not commercially available in both the United States and France. The song peaked atop the US Billboard Hot 100 for seven weeks, making it the longest reigning hit of the year, and notably reached number one on the singles charts in Canada, Poland, South Africa, Japan and the UK R&B Chart, as well as peaking within the top 10 of the majority of the singles charts worldwide. To date, it is Jackson's tenth and last number one Hot 100 hit in the United States.

"All for You" is considered one of Jackson's signature hits, and received a Grammy Award for Best Dance Recording, ASCAP Award for Song of the Year, and Teen Choice Award for Best Single, as well as several sales awards in the United Kingdom and Japan, and certifications in Australia, France, New Zealand, and the United Kingdom. It was later included in two of Jackson's greatest hits collections, Number Ones (2009) and Icon: Number Ones (2010). The song's music video received several accolades, including a nomination for Video of the Year at the 2001 MTV Video Music Awards.

Background and release
The prior year, Janet Jackson released "Doesn't Really Matter" as her first solo single since "Every Time" from her album The Velvet Rope. The song was taken from the soundtrack to The Nutty Professor II: The Klumps, in which Jackson stars with Eddie Murphy. Following the success of the song, which topped the Billboard charts for three weeks, Jackson started working on a new album, which was described as "upbeat, fun and carefree." Jackson's co-producer Jimmy Jam announced that the album's likely first single was an "'80s-sounding" dance number, which "epitomizes the disc's happy vibe", he said.

"All for You" prominently samples the 1980 song "The Glow of Love", written by Wayne Garfield, David Romani, and Mauro Malavasi and performed by italo disco band Change. According to Jam, when he proposed the record to Jackson, she did not recognize the song or his writer Mauro Malavasi, however "she instantly liked it because it made her want to dance".

Jam added, "In the history of Janet, the records that are the happy records, that make people smile, have always traditionally been the more successful records, ... going back as far to songs like 'When I Think of You' to 'Doesn't Really Matter.' This continues that tradition, with kind of a nod to the dance music of the '80s." The song was expected to be ready for radio "in the next couple of weeks, and an accompanying video will be shot shortly thereafter," the producer said. It was released to radio stations on March 6, 2001.

Britney Spears' "Anticipating" received frequent comparisons to the song by music critics for its similar production and arrangement.

Composition and lyrics

"All for You" was written and produced by Jackson, Jam, and Terry Lewis, with Garfield, Romani, and Malavasi receiving songwriting credits due to the sampled music. Written in the key of G major, it has a moderate tempo of 114 beats per minute. Jackson's vocal range span from the low-note of G3 to the high-note of E5. "All for You" is a dance-pop song, with elements of R&B and disco. Lyrically, the song explores Janet's outlook on dating. In a night club setting, Janet flirts with someone that appears intimidated by her celebrity. In a playful, erotic tone, she assures him that she is easy-going and unconcerned with status. The "Video Mix" edit of the song features a dance-break, which contains samples from many of Janet's previous singles, such as "Go Deep" and "The Pleasure Principle". It was later included on Janet's second hits compilation Number Ones.

Critical reception
The song received positive reviews from music critics. David Browne of Entertainment Weekly gave the single a "B" rating, writing that the song is "a frothy butt shaker and skilled throwback to old-school disco," calling it "another Jackson package with pretty ribbons but little inside." Anthony DeCurtis of Rolling Stone praised the song for "swirling on the dizzying energy of a disco-era sample," while Tom Sinclair of Entertainment Weekly noted the track "recalls the old McFadden & Whitehead positivity anthem 'Ain't No Stoppin' Us Now'", recasting it as "chirpy computer pop overlaid with a silky Jackson vocal." NME called the song a "faultless funk affair", while AllMusic said the song would maintain Jackson and her producer's reputation as the "leading lights of contemporary urban soul."

Billboard considered it "a veritable vitamin shot in the arm for the airwaves," and "as playful and joyous as the best from Jackson's deep uptempo catalog." The review also noted the song "audaciously ignores top 40's current trend toward strict R&B inflection" and "is mainstream party pop at its best." Barnes & Noble observed Jackson to be "in a sunnier mood", adding "she chirps the title track's sparkling dance pop over a piano-and-bass hook". Anthony Carew of Neumu.net described the song as a "fine neo-disco/'80s-retro collage", with Devdoot Majumdar of The Tech calling it "frothy dance pop", noting the song had Jackson's "signature elaborateness" and was "radio-ready material".

Chart performance
Upon release, Teri VanHorn of MTV News dubbed Jackson "Queen of Radio" as the single made radio airplay history, "[being] added to every pop, rhythmic and urban radio station that reports to the national trade magazine Radio & Records." Quoting R&Rs Kevin McCabe, VanHorn added that "No other song has conquered all reporting stations in its first week at radio, let alone mastered three formats in one week." The song's overall airplay record was later broken by Lady Gaga's "Born This Way", although Gaga's single was able to achieve the feat with a radio airplay deal to play the song hourly.

"All for You" also debuted on the Billboard Hot 100 singles chart at number 14; the highest debut ever for a single that was not commercially available. In its third week, the song climbed from number six to number three, while in its fifth week on the chart, the song jumped to the top of the Hot 100 chart. It became the first song by a female artist of the decade to advance to number one, and Jackson's tenth number-one hit, also reaching the top of Billboard's Hot R&B/Hip-Hop Singles chart. The song remained at number-one for seven consecutive weeks, becoming the year's longest-running chart-topper on the Hot 100. "All for You" is also notably Jackson's last number-one hit to date in the United States. It also topped the Hot Dance Club Songs chart, becoming her thirteenth number-one dance hit. Billboard accurately predicted the song's chart-topping success, saying, "This offers the promise of good days ahead for a career that has never stalled, but at times has felt more deliberate than others. Expect instantaneous across-the-board action on this from adult, rhythmic, and mainstream top 40s, as well as AC and R&B. It's going to be a 'Rhythm Nation' this spring, indeed. Quite likely another No.1 for Janet."

In Australia, "All for You" debuted and peaked at number five. It became Janet's highest charting-single on the ARIA Charts since "Together Again". It was certified platinum by the Australian Recording Industry Association, for selling over 70,000 copies. In New Zealand, the song debuted at number 34, before remaining at number 14 for three consecutive weeks. Later, it climbed to number two, its peak position, remaining for a further week at the peak position. By doing so, "All for You" became her best-performing single since "Scream" and "Whoops Now".

In the United Kingdom, the song debuted and peaked at number three, the highest entry of the week. It became her best charting-single since "That's the Way Love Goes". It was later certified Silver and became her best-selling UK single behind "Together Again" and "That's the Way Love Goes". The song set a record in France for the highest debut of a promotional recording that was not commercially available, with the song being broadcast over 268 times in five days. It debuted at number 11, eventually peaking at number three. It was certified gold by the Syndicat National de l'Édition Phonographique, for selling 75,000 copies. In Italy, "All for You" is Janet's highest charting-single, peaking at number five, while in Finland, it also placed as her best single on the charts.

Awards and nominations

Music video
The "All for You" music video was directed by Dave Meyers and premiered on March 9, 2001, on MTV's TRL. The video takes place in a colorful two-dimensional world where Jackson wears jeans ripped at the knees and changes her tank top on three occasions: multi-colored, white and black with a leather jacket over one arm. The video's concept is based on Jackson admiring a man whom she meets on the subway. Jackson and her dancers perform high-octane choreography throughout the video, which features a dance break that briefly samples several different songs, (her sister Rebbie Jackson's "Centipede", Jackson's own hits "The Pleasure Principle" and "Go Deep", and Shannon's "Let the Music Play"). The video ends with Jackson spotting the man near a nightclub, who smiles at her as she waves at him before turning to leave.

Reception and accolades
The video was nominated for Video of the Year, Best Female Video, Best Dance Video, and Best Choreography at the 2001 MTV Video Music Awards. "All for You" won the award for "Best Dance Video" at the International Dance Music Awards and "Best Choreography" at the MVPA Awards. It appears on the special edition of All for You, which also includes a live performance of the song from Jackson's MTV Icon special, as well as the videos compilation From Janet to Damita Jo: The Videos.

Jonathan Hailey placed the video at number nine on "Janet Jackson's 10 Best Dance Videos", writing that "she kept us yearning for more when she busted out the slick dance moves and barely there ab-baring tops." BuzzFeed placed the video at number seven on their list of "Janet's Best Music Videos" calling it "A futuristic, 2-D setting, full of electric color and cheeky choreography."

Live performances

Jackson first performed "All for You" at the finale of her MTV Icon special, which honored her legacy and influence in the music industry, followed by a dance breakdown to "You Ain't Right". The song was also performed on Top of the Pops, CD:UK, Wetten Dass, TMF Awards, ECHO Awards, Nulle Part Ailleurs, Late Night with Luuk in Stockholm, London's Graines De Star, Tapis Rouge in Paris, Hit Machine, Quelli Il Calcio in Milan, Italy, and Michael Jackson's United We Stand: What More Can I Give benefit concert. Jackson later performed the song at MSN and Wango Tango during promotion for her following album Damita Jo. "All for You" was also performed with "Make Me" during Janet's performance on The X Factor UK in 2009.

Jackson performed the song on her All for You Tour, Rock Witchu Tour, Number Ones, Up Close and Personal Tour, Unbreakable World Tour, and the State of the World Tour. "All for You" was notoriously performed along with "Rhythm Nation" and "The Knowledge" at the Super Bowl XXXVIII halftime show, with Jackson wearing a leather gladiator outfit. The show featured 26 dancers, 360 regular band members and a 60-person drum line. At the end of the performance, surprise guest Justin Timberlake appeared to perform his song "Rock Your Body" with Jackson. He accidentally exposed her breast, ending in a massively controversial incident, resulting a blacklist of Jackson's subsequent singles and music videos from several conglomerates, including Viacom and CBS and various subsidiaries, which largely affected Jackson's airplay on many radio formats and music channels worldwide. Jackson also included the song on her 2019 Las Vegas Residency Janet Jackson: Metamorphosis.

Track listings and formats

US CD and cassette single 
 "All for You" (radio edit) – 4:24
 "All for You" (video mix) – 4:37

US 12-inch single 
A1. "All for You" (Thunderpuss club mix) – 10:28
A2. "All for You" (album version) – 6:31
B1. "All for You" (DJ Quik remix) – 4:29
B2. "All for You" (Top Heavy mix) – 4:05
B3. "All for You" (Rock mix) – 7:20

UK CD single 
 "All for You" (radio edit) – 4:24
 "All for You" (Top Heavy mix) – 4:06
 "All for You" (Thunderpuss club mix) – 10:28
 "All for You" (video)

UK 12-inch single 
A1. "All for You" (Thunderpuss club mix) – 10:28
B1. "All for You" (Top Heavy remix) – 4:06
B2. "All for You" (radio edit) – 4:24

UK cassette single 
 "All For You" (radio edit) – 4:24
 "All For You" (Top Heavy remix) – 4:06
 "All For You" (Thunderpuss club mix) – 10:28

European CD single 
 "All for You" (radio edit) – 4:23
 "All for You" (Top Heavy remix) – 4:06

Australasian and Taiwanese CD single 
 "All for You" (radio edit) – 4:24
 "All for You" (DJ Quik remix) – 4:29
 "All for You" (Thunderpuss club mix) – 10:28
 "All for You" (Rock mix) – 7:20
 "All for You" (Top Heavy mix) – 4:06

iTunes EP
 "All for You" – 6:32
 "All for You" (Top Heavy remix) – 4:06
 "All for You" (Thunderpuss club mix) – 10:28

Credits and personnel
Credits are lifted from the All For You album booklet.

Studios
 Recorded and mixed at Flyte Tyme Studios (Edina, Minnesota)
 Mastered at Bernie Grundman Mastering (Hollywood, California)

Personnel

 Janet Jackson – writing, all vocals, production
 Jimmy Jam – writing (James Harris III), all additional instruments, production
 Terry Lewis – writing, all additional instruments, production
 Wayne Garfield – writing
 David Romani – writing
 Mauro Malavasi – writing
 David Barry – guitar
 Alex Richbourg – drum and MIDI programming
 Steve Hodge – recording, mixing
 Brad Yost – recording and mixing assistant
 Xavier Smith – recording and mixing assistant
 Brian "Big Bass" Gardner – mastering
 Mike Bozzi – mastering assistant

Charts

Weekly charts

Year-end charts

Decade-end charts

Certifications

Release history

References

2000 songs
2001 singles
Billboard Hot 100 number-one singles
Canadian Singles Chart number-one singles
Grammy Award for Best Dance Recording
Janet Jackson songs
Music videos directed by Dave Meyers (director)
Number-one singles in Poland
Song recordings produced by Jimmy Jam and Terry Lewis
Songs written by Janet Jackson
Songs written by Jimmy Jam and Terry Lewis